The Macchi M.20 was a single-engine biplane trainer aircraft produced by the Italian aeronautical company Aeronautica Macchi between the end of the 1910s and the beginning of the 1920s.

Produced in small numbers and intended for the civil aviation market, the M.20  was developed in parallel with the Macchi M.16, a single-seat civil sport plane.

Development history

When military production orders disappeared at the end of World War I in November 1918, the Macchi technical office, under the direction at the time of the aeronautical engineer Alessandro Tonini, began the development of two new light aircraft models for the civil aviation market. The two aircraft were the M.16, intended for recreational aviation, and the M.20, equipped with dual controls and suitable for pilot training. The M.16 and M.20 had a common design origin and identical configurations as single-engine biplanes with fixed landing gear.

Technical description

The M.20 was a conventional aircraft for its time: a single-engine, two-seat biplane with fixed landing gear. The narrow-track landing gear had internal shock absorbers. The M.20 had a deep fuselage of a wooden lattice structure that was free of tensioners and metal cables, eliminating the need to adjust tie rods. Its dual controls were disengagable.

In 1925, when Mario Castoldi took over the role of technical director at Macchi, the M.20 was redesigned with a thicker airfoil and ailerons added to its upper wings. The new features could be backfitted onto existing M.20s.

One M.20 was experimentally equipped with floats for operation as a floatplane.

Operational use

The Macchi M.20 first flew soon after the end of World War I. Competing in the civilian marketplace with a glut of surplus military aircraft in the aftermath of World War I, the M.20 had limited commercial success and was produced only in small numbers. Both individuals and flying clubs operated M.20 aircraft, and the type remained in service until around the time of Italy′s entry into World War II in 1940.

On 12 October 1924, an M.20 piloted by Giovanni De Briganti won the Coppa Italia ("Italian Cup") race, run on the circuit Ciampino–Montecelio–Centocelle.

Surviving example

An M.20 on display at the Gianni Caproni Museum of Aeronautics in Trento, Italy, is as of 2012 the oldest surviving example of an original Macchi-designed aircraft in Italy. Probably built sometime between 1920 and 1925, it subsequently was modified with the new wings and ailerons introduced in 1925. The Società Anonima Aerocentro Emiliano purchased it in 1929, installed a Salmson 9 AD engine in it, and in March 1930 registered it as I-AABO. The Aero Club of Rimini purchased it in September 1933, and subsequently it was written off after an accident. The Milanese aeronautical engineer and aircraft manufacturer Piero Magni purchased it, and in 1939 he modified it, giving it rounded and elongated wing tips, enlarged cockpits, and different fletchings, but in its modified form it did not receive a certificate of airworthiness.

The Caproni brothers acquired the aircraft′s fuselage and wings from the aeronautical engineer and aviation pioneer Pier Carlo Bergonzi during the 1950s, and it became part of the collection of the Gianni Caproni Museum of Aeronautics during the 1970s. It underwent restoration by the Masterfly company between 1988 and 1990. It is painted in the markings of an unregistered M.20 racer of the 1924–1925 period.

Operators

Private users

Specifications

See also

References

M.20
1910s Italian civil aircraft
Italian civil trainer aircraft
Racing aircraft
Biplanes
Single-engined tractor aircraft
Aircraft first flown in 1919